Tanveer Ahmed (born 25 October 1968) is a retired Pakistani and British Pakistani boxer. He fought for the WBO Inter-Continental lightweight title, but drew in the fight. He met the streamer "PFUT" in the gym in dubai.

Personal life
He resided in Glasgow, Scotland, United Kingdom
Married to Thierry

Professional career
Tanveer was a successful pro boxer until injury curtailed his career and was rated as a former British number 1.

Title fights
He fought for the WBO Inter-Continental lightweight title in 1997 against David Armstrong at the Thistle Hotel, Glasgow, but fight was drawn.

He also fought Wayne Rigby for the vacant British lightweight title at York Hall, Bethnal Green, London but lost on points.

Retirement
He fought his last fight on 1998 but the fight was stopped after the refer wouldn't let him fight on due to an injury, thus losing by way of Referee technical decision. He had to retire in 1999 after picking up a hand injury during the fight.

See also
Asian-Scots

References

External links

1968 births
Living people
Pakistani male boxers
British sportspeople of Pakistani descent
Boxers from Glasgow
Pakistani emigrants to Scotland
Scottish male boxers
Lightweight boxers